Neerppuzha (നീര്‍പ്പുഴ) is the first noted tributary of Chaliyar. It is a small river originating from the forests east to Munderi, in Pothukal Panchayath of Malappuram district. It joins with Chaliyar at Kambippalam near Thamburattikkallu.

Rivers of Malappuram district